is a former Japanese football player. He played for Japan national team.

Club career
Kobata was born in Saitama on November 24, 1946. After graduating from Meiji University, he joined Hitachi in 1969. In 1972, the club won the Japan Soccer League and the Emperor's Cup. The club also won the 1975 Emperor's Cup. He retired in 1975. He played 99 games and scored 22 goals in the league. He was selected as one of the Best Eleven in 1970.

National team career
On July 31, 1970, Kobata debuted for Japan national team against Hong Kong. In December, he was selected Japan for 1970 Asian Games. He also played at 1974 World Cup qualification in 1973. He played 13 games for Japan until 1973.

Club statistics

National team statistics

Awards
 Japan Soccer League Best Eleven: 1970

References

External links
 
 Japan National Football Team Database

1946 births
Living people
Meiji University alumni
Association football people from Saitama Prefecture
Japanese footballers
Japan international footballers
Japan Soccer League players
Kashiwa Reysol players
Footballers at the 1970 Asian Games
Association football midfielders
Asian Games competitors for Japan